Pt. Deen Dayal Upadhyaya Inter College (Hindi: पण्डित दीन दयाल उपाध्याय इंटर कॉलेज) is a Hindi and English medium school situated in Kanpur Dehat, Uttar Pradesh, India. The method of teaching is based on standards set by Uttar Pradesh Secondary Education. The school provides secondary education up to 10+2 level. Mr. Santosh Kumar Pathak  is the current incumbent principal of the school.

The school is named in memory of Deen Dayal Upadhyaya, a pandit known as a philosopher, ideologue, thinker and social worker. The foundation of this institution was laid by prominent persons from Rajpur in 1991.

References

Education in Kanpur Dehat district
Intermediate colleges in Uttar Pradesh